Rodrigo Augusto Sabiá (born 3 September 1992) is a Brazilian professional footballer who plays as a centre back for Paulista, on loan from Grêmio.

Career statistics

References

External links
Rodrigo Sabiá profile. Portal Oficial do Grêmio.

1992 births
Living people
Brazilian footballers
Grêmio Foot-Ball Porto Alegrense players
Grêmio Osasco Audax Esporte Clube players
Campeonato Brasileiro Série A players
Association football defenders
People from Mogi Guaçu